Wasco State Prison-Reception Center (WSP) is a  state prison located in Wasco, Kern County, California.

The Wasco facility was the first of two reception centers in Kern County. The primary mission is to provide short term housing necessary to process, classify, and evaluate new inmates physically and mentally, to determine their security level, program requirements, and appropriate institutional placement. A 400-bed medium custody facility houses general population inmates to help support and maintain the reception center. A minimum custody facility provides institutional maintenance and landscaping services.

As of July 31, 2022, Wasco was incarcerating people at 122.8% of its design capacity, with 3,667 occupants.

Notable inmates
Kori Ali Muhammad, moved to Kern Valley State Prison
Edward Younghoon Shin
Brandon Browner, moved to San Quentin State Prison
John Getreu, moved to Richard J. Donovan Correctional Facility

References

External links
 Wasco State Prison-Reception Center Contact and Visiting Information
 California Department of Corrections and Rehabilitation Official website

1991 establishments in California
Buildings and structures in Kern County, California
Prisons in California